Jefferson Franklin Long (March 3, 1836 – February 4, 1901) was a U.S. congressman from Georgia. He was the second African American sworn into the U.S. House of Representatives and the first African-American congressman from Georgia. Long was the first African-American Representative to speak on the floor of the U.S. House, opposing the Amnesty Bill that exempted former Confederates serving in the House from swearing allegiance to the Constitution. He remained the only African American to represent Georgia until Andrew Young was elected in 1972.

Biography
Long was born into slavery to an enslaved mother and a white father near the city of Knoxville in Crawford County, Georgia on March 3, 1836. He taught himself to read and write, an illegal act for slaves, while setting type for the newspaper in Macon, Georgia. By 1860 Long had married Lucinda Carhart and had started a family. By the end of the American Civil War an emancipated Long had become a successful merchant tailor in Macon, Georgia.

Long had established himself as a prominent member of the Republican Party in 1867 and was elected in 1870 as a Republican to the Forty-first Congress to serve a term from January 16 to March 3, 1871. Georgia had no congressional representation from March 1869 to December 1870 due to the states failure to ratify the Fifteenth Amendment. Long is best known for his speech on the floor of the House of Representatives in opposition of a measure to provide amnesty to former Confederates:

He was not a candidate for re-election in 1870 due to anti-Reconstruction efforts by the white-majority Georgia GOP, but remained active in politics and serve as a delegate to the Republican National Convention from 1872 to 1880.

After his congressional term, Long returned to his tailoring business in Macon which he ran with one of his sons.

Long died from influenza on February 4, 1901, and was interred at Linwood Cemetery in Macon.

See also
List of African-American United States representatives

References

Bibliography
 Matthews, John M. "Jefferson Franklin Long: The Public Career of Georgia's First Black Congressman." Phylon 42 (June 1981): 145–56.
 Logan, Rayford W. "Long, Jefferson Franklin." In Dictionary of American Negro Biography, edited by Rayford W. Logan and Michael R. Winston, pp. 405. New York: W.W. Norton and Co., 1982.
 Hardwick, Grace. "Jefferson Franklin Long (1836-1901)." New Georgia Encyclopedia. 5 January 2017. Web. 28 March 2018.

External links

1836 births
1901 deaths
African-American people in Georgia (U.S. state) politics
African-American members of the United States House of Representatives
19th-century American slaves
Republican Party members of the United States House of Representatives from Georgia (U.S. state)
People from Crawford County, Georgia
19th-century American politicians
African-American politicians during the Reconstruction Era
American tailors